Helen Wright may refer to:

 Mary Helen Wright Greuter (1914–1997), American astronomer and historian
 Helen Wright (actress) (1868–1928), American actress
 Helen Williams (curler) (born 1973), née Wright, Australian curler
 Helen Wright (politician) born 1943, first female Lord Provost of Dundee